Lieutenant-General Sir George Sidney Clive,  (16 July 1874 – 7 October 1959) was a British Army officer who subsequently became Military Secretary.

Background and education
Clive was the son of General Edward Clive and Isabel Webb and he was educated at Harrow School and the Royal Military College, Sandhurst,

Military career
Clive was commissioned into the Grenadier Guards in 1893, and promoted to lieutenant on 26 October 1897. He took part in the military expedition to the Sudan in 1898, and was promoted to captain on 28 January 1900, during a temporary appointment as Adjutant of the 3rd battalion (19 January – 24 March 1900). He fought in the Second Boer War between 1900 and 1902; he was part of a detachment sent to South Africa in March 1900 to reinforce the 3rd battalion. For his service in the war he was awarded the Distinguished Service Order (DSO). He attended Staff College, Camberley in 1903 and became a General Staff Officer at the War Office in 1905.

He served in the First World War as Head of the British Mission at the French Army headquarters from 1915 to the end of the War and was invested as a Companion of the Order of the Bath. Clive also received several decorations from France, Belgium and Russia.

After the War, in 1919, Clive was appointed Military Governor of Cologne and from 1919 to 1920, he was Commander of the 1st Infantry Brigade at Aldershot (as a temporary Brigadier). He was appointed British Military Representative to the Armaments Commission of the League of Nations in Geneva in 1921 and became Military attaché in Paris in 1924, rising to Major-General in the same year. He was appointed Director of Personal Services at the War Office in 1928 and Military Secretary in 1930. He was invested as a Knight Commander of the Order of the Bath (KCB) in 1933.

Clive retired from the army in 1934, as a Lieutenant General, and served as Marshal of the Diplomatic Corps between 1934 and 1946 and as High Sheriff of Herefordshire in 1939. He was invested as a Knight Grand Cross of the Royal Victorian Order (GCVO) in 1937. Clive was a Justice of the Peace and the Deputy Lieutenant of Herefordshire.

He died on 7 October 1959 in a disastrous fire at the family home, Perrystone Court, near Ross-on-Wye.

Family
On 26 March 1901 Clive married Madeline Buxton and the couple had three sons (including Archer Clive, who fought with distinction in World War II) and two daughters.

Awards and decorations
 Knight Grand Cross of the Royal Victorian Order (1937)
 Knight Commander, Order of the Bath (1933)
 Companion of the Order of St. Michael and St. George (1919)
 Distinguished Service Order
 Croix de Guerre (France)
 Grand Officer of the Legion of Honour (France)
 Commander of the Order of the Crown (Belgium)
 Croix de Guerre (Belgium)
 Order of St. Stanislaus with swords (Russia)

References

 

1874 births
1959 deaths
People educated at Harrow School
Graduates of the Royal Military College, Sandhurst
Graduates of the Staff College, Camberley
British Army lieutenant generals
Knights Grand Cross of the Royal Victorian Order
Knights Commander of the Order of the Bath
Companions of the Order of St Michael and St George
Companions of the Distinguished Service Order
Recipients of the Croix de guerre (Belgium)
Recipients of the Croix de Guerre 1914–1918 (France)
Grand Officiers of the Légion d'honneur
Commanders of the Order of the Crown (Belgium)
Marshals of the Diplomatic Corps
British Army personnel of World War I
British Army personnel of the Mahdist War
British Army personnel of the Second Boer War
High Sheriffs of Herefordshire
Grenadier Guards officers
Deputy Lieutenants of Herefordshire
English justices of the peace
British military attachés